Henri-Émile Van Cutsem (1839–1904) was a Belgian patron of the arts, and also himself a painter

Biography 
Van Cutsem was born in Brussels into a family of hoteliers who had become wealthy from their business. He studied law at Liège. During long stays in Paris he developed good relations with many of the artistic community. In 1890 he acquired two adjacent blocks of flats on the Avenue des Arts in Saint-Josse-ten-Noode which he had refurbished by Victor Horta.

He died in Ochamps of pneumonia.

Patronage 
Van Cutsem developed his father's art collections and gave his moral and financial support to many artists, notably the sculptor Guillaume Charlier, to whom Van Cutsem bequeathed his property on the Avenue des Arts, which after Charlier's death became the Charlier Museum, established on 21 October 1928.

Among the many artists whom he supported were Édouard Agneessens, Théodore Baron, Géo Bernier, Jan Van Beers, Eugène Broerman, Albéric Collin, James Ensor, Joseph Stevens and Willy Finch.

Legacy 
Van Cutsem's collections were given to the Musée des Beaux-Arts in Tournai.

Notes and references

External links 

 HetStillepand.be: Henri Van Cutsem  
 Tento.be: Henri Van Cutsem  

1839 births
1904 deaths
Businesspeople from Brussels
Deaths from pneumonia in Belgium
Belgian art collectors
Belgian patrons of the arts